Ryan Johnson Laursen (born 14 April 1992) is a Danish-American footballer who plays as a right-back.

Career
Coming to Lyngby from Birkerød in 2007 as a youngster, his impressive displays for the Lyngby youth teams was awarded his first professional contract in October 2010.

Following impressive displays for Lyngby in the Danish 1st Division and for the Danish U21 team, he was under the monitor for Superliga clubs Esbjerg fB and FC Nordsjælland.

On September 2, the last day of the Danish transfer window, Laursen transferred to Esbjerg for an undisclosed fee. At Esbjerg, he would be reunited with his former Lyngby manager Niels Frederiksen.

The American born full back departed the club midway through the 2016–17 season to join Odense Boldklub. In July 2022, Laursen joined SønderjyskE on a deal for the rest of 2022. He left the club again at the end of the year.

References

External links
 Ryan Laursen on DBU 
 
  Official Danish Superliga stats 

1992 births
Living people
Danish men's footballers
Danish people of American descent
American people of Danish descent
IF Skjold Birkerød players
Lyngby Boldklub players
Esbjerg fB players
SønderjyskE Fodbold players
Association football defenders
Soccer players from California
Danish Superliga players
Denmark youth international footballers
Denmark under-21 international footballers